Sherwood is an unincorporated community in Talbot County, Maryland, United States. Sherwood is located along Maryland Route 33 on the eastern shore of the Chesapeake Bay, south of Claiborne and north of Tilghman Island. USPS has assigned Sherwood the ZIP Code 21665. The Sandy, a log canoe ported in Sherwood, was listed on the National Register of Historic Places in 1985.

References

Unincorporated communities in Maryland
Unincorporated communities in Talbot County, Maryland
Maryland populated places on the Chesapeake Bay